State Route 317 (SR 317) is a  state highway in Lincoln County, Nevada. It connects the ghost town of Elgin north to U.S. Route 93 (US 93) in the city of Caliente. Portions of the highway were heavily damaged by flooding in January 2005 and repairs were not yet complete as of January 2015.

History
State Route 55 was a state highway in the U.S. state of Nevada, running south from U.S. Route 93 in Caliente into Kershaw–Ryan State Park. It was defined by 1935 and survived until the 1976 renumbering.   As a result of the renumbering, SR 317 was assigned to the segment of SR 55 from US 93 in Caliente to Kershaw Park Entrance Rd.

Major intersections

References

317
Transportation in Lincoln County, Nevada